The 2012 Tour de France was the 99th edition of the race, one of cycling's Grand Tours. It started in the Belgian city of Liège on 30 June and finished on the Champs-Élysées in Paris on 22 July.

The race was contested by a total of twenty-two teams. All eighteen of the 2012 UCI World Tour's ProTeams were entitled, and obliged, to enter. In April 2012, the organizer of the Tour, Amaury Sport Organisation (ASO), announced the four UCI Professional Continental teams given wildcard invitations, of which three were French-based (and ) and one Dutch. The presentation of the teams – where each team's roster are introduced in front of the media and local dignitaries – took place outside the Prince-Bishops' Palace in Liège, two days before the first stage.

Each squad was allowed a maximum of nine riders, resulting in a start list total of 198 riders. Of these, 35 were riding the Tour de France for the first time. From the riders that began the race, 153 crossed the finish line in Paris. The average rider age was 30.17, with 22-year-old Thibaut Pinot as the youngest rider, and 40-year-old Jens Voigt the oldest. Of the total average ages,  was the youngest team and  the oldest. The riders came from 31 countries; France, Spain, Netherlands, Italy, Belgium, Germany and Australia all had 12 or more riders in the race. Riders from six countries won at least one stage; British riders won the largest number of stages, a total of seven.
 
Fabian Cancellara won the prologue and held the general classification leader's yellow jersey for the first week. 's Bradley Wiggins, second in the prologue, took the leadership of the race on stage seven, the first mountainous stage. He maintained his lead for the remainder of the race, winning the two longest time trials, and not losing time to his main challengers for the overall title in the mountains. Wiggins's teammate Chris Froome placed second, and Vincenzo Nibali was third. The points classification was won by Nibali's teammate Peter Sagan, who won three stages. 's Thomas Voeckler, winner of two mountain stages, won the mountains classification, and 's Tejay van Garderen, in fifth place overall, won the award for the best young rider.

Teams 

ProTeams

  (riders)
  (riders)
  (riders)
  (riders)
  (riders)
  (riders)
  (riders)
  (riders)
  (riders)
  (riders)
  (riders)
  (riders)
  (riders)
  (riders)
  (riders)
  (riders)
  (riders)
  (riders)

Professional Continental teams

  (riders)
  (riders)
  (riders)
  (riders)

Cyclists

By starting number

By team

By nationality

Notes and references

Footnotes

References

Sources

External links 
 

2012 Tour de France
2012